The K factor or characterization factor is defined from Rankine boiling temperature °R=1.8Tb[k] and relative to water density ρ at 60°F: 

K(UOP) =  

The K factor is a systematic way of classifying a crude oil according to its paraffinic, naphthenic, intermediate or aromatic nature. 12.5 or higher indicate a crude oil of predominantly paraffinic constituents, while 10 or lower indicate a crude of more aromatic nature. The K(UOP) is also referred to as the UOP K factor or just UOPK.

See also
 Crude oil assay

References

External links
 Pipe fitting friction calculation
 Pipe Friction Loss Calculations

Oil refining
Separation processes